The 2003 Ontario general election was held on October 2, 2003, to elect the 103 members of the 38th Legislative Assembly (Members of Provincial Parliament, or "MPPs") of the Province of Ontario, Canada.

The election was called on September 2 by Premier Ernie Eves in the wake of supporting polls for the governing Ontario Progressive Conservative Party in the days following the 2003 North American blackout. The election resulted in a majority government won by the Ontario Liberal Party, led by Dalton McGuinty.

Leadup to the campaign

In 1995, the Ontario Progressive Conservative Party under Mike Harris came from third place to upset the front-running Ontario Liberal Party under Lyn McLeod and the governing Ontario New Democratic Party under Bob Rae to form a majority government. Over the following two terms, the Harris government moved to cut personal income tax rates by 30%, closed almost 40 hospitals to increase efficiency, cut the Ministry of the Environment staff in half, and undertook massive reforms of the education system, including mandatory teacher testing, student testing in public education, and public tax credits for parents who sent their children to private schools.

In the 1999 provincial election, the Tories were able to ride a strong economy and a campaign aimed at proving rookie Liberal leader Dalton McGuinty was "not up to the job" to another majority government. The Walkerton Tragedy, however, where a contaminated water supply led to the deaths of 7 people and illness of at least 2,300 were linked in part to government environment and regulatory cutbacks, and as a result the government's popularity was badly damaged. A movement to provide tax credits to parents with children in private schools also proved to be unpopular.

In October 2001, Harris announced his intention to resign, and the PC party called a leadership convention for 2002 to replace him. Five candidates emerged: former Finance Minister Ernie Eves who had retired earlier that year, Finance Minister Jim Flaherty, Environment Minister Elizabeth Witmer, Health Minister Tony Clement and Labour Minister Chris Stockwell. The resulting leadership election was divisive in the PC Party, with Flaherty adopting a hard-right platform and attacking the front-running Eves as "a pale, pink imitation of Dalton McGuinty" and a "serial waffler". At one point, anti-abortion activists apparently supporting Flaherty distributed pamphlets attacking Tony Clement because his wife worked for hospitals that performed abortions. At the convention, Eves won on the second ballot after Elizabeth Witmer and Tony Clement both endorsed him.

Eves took office on April 15, 2002, and promptly re-aligned his government to the political centre. The party would negotiate a deal with striking government workers, dramatically cancel an IPO of Hydro One, the government's electricity transmission company, and defer planned tax breaks for corporations and private schools for a year. With polls showing the Conservatives moving from a 15-point deficit to a tie in public opinion with the Liberals, the media praising Eves' political reorientation of the government, and the opposition Liberals reeling from the seizure of some of their political turf, the time seemed ripe for a snap election call. Many political observers felt that Eves had the momentum to win an election at that time.

However, several factors likely convinced Eves to wait to call an election. First, in 1990, the Liberals had lost the election in part due to perceptions that they called the election early for purely partisan reasons. Since then, the shortest distance between elections had been four years less five days (Ontario has since moved to fixed date election dates). Second, the PC Party was exhausted and divided from a six-month leadership contest. Third, the move to the centre had created opposition in traditional Conservative support. Financial conservatives and businesses were angered over Eves' cancellation of the hydro IPO. Others felt betrayed that promised tax cuts had not been delivered, seemingly breaking the PCs' own Taxpayer Protection Act, while private school supporters were upset their promised tax credit had been delayed for a year.

In the fall of 2002, the opposition Liberals began a round of attacks on perceived PC mismanagement. First, Jim Flaherty was embroiled in scandal when it was revealed that his leadership campaign's largest donor had received a highly lucrative contract for slot machines from the government. Then, Tourism Minister Cam Jackson was forced to resign when the Liberals revealed he had charged taxpayers more than $100,000 for hotel rooms, steak dinners and alcoholic beverages. The Liberals showed the Tories had secretly given a large tax break to the Toronto Blue Jays, a team owned by prominent Tory Ted Rogers.

At the same time, both the New Democrats and Liberals criticized the government over skyrocketing electricity prices. In May 2002, the government had followed California and Alberta in deregulating the electricity market. With contracting supply due to construction delays at the Pickering nuclear power plant and rising demand for electricity in an unusually warm autumn, the spot price for electricity rose, resulting in consumer outrage. In November, Eves fixed the price of electricity and ended the open market, appeasing consumers but angering conservative free-marketers.

That winter, Eves promised a provincial budget before the beginning of the fiscal year, to help hospitals and schools budget effectively. However, as multiple scandals in the fall had already made the party unwilling to return to Question Period, they wished to dismiss the Legislative Assembly of Ontario until as late as possible in the spring. The budget was instead to be announced at the Magna International headquarters in Newmarket, Ontario, rather than in the Legislature. The move was met with outrage from the PC Speaker Gary Carr, who called the move unconstitutional and would rule that it was a prima facie case of contempt of the legislature. The controversy over the location of the budget far outstripped any support earned by the content of the budget.

The government faced a major crisis when SARS killed several people in Toronto and threatened the stability of the health care system. On April 23, when the World Health Organization advised against all but essential travel to Toronto to prevent the spread of the virus, Toronto tourism greatly suffered.

When the spring session was finally convened in late spring, the Eves government was forced through three days of debate on the contempt motion over the Magna budget followed by weeks of calls for the resignation of Energy Minister Chris Stockwell. Stockwell was accused of accepting thousands of dollars in undeclared gifts from Ontario Power Generation, an arms-length crown corporation he regulated, when he travelled to Europe in the summer of 2002. Stockwell finally stepped aside after dominating the provincial news for almost a month, and did not seek reelection.

By the summer of 2003, the Progressive Conservatives received an unexpected opportunity to re-gain popularity in the form of the 2003 North American blackout. When the blackout hit, Eves initially received criticism for his late response; however, as he led a series of daily briefings to the press in the days after the blackout, Eves was able to demonstrate leadership and stayed cool under pressure. The crisis also allowed Eves to highlight his principal campaign themes of experience, proven competence and ability to handle the government. When polls began to register a moderate increase for the Conservatives, the table was set for an election call.

Progressive Conservative campaign
In 1995 and 1999, the Progressive Conservatives ran highly focused, disciplined campaigns based on lessons learned principally in US states by the Republican Party. In 1995, the core PC strategy was to polarize the electorate around a handful of controversial ideas that would split opposition between the other two parties. The PCs stressed radical tax cuts, opposition to job quotas, slashing welfare rates and a few hot button issues such as opposing photo radar and establishing "boot camps" for young offenders. They positioned leader Mike Harris as an average-guy populist who would restore common sense to government after ten lost years of NDP and Liberal mismanagement. The campaign manifesto, released in 1994, was titled the "Common Sense Revolution" and advocated a supply-side economics solution to a perceived economic malaise.

In 1999, the PCs were able to point to increased economic activity as evidence that their supply side plan worked. Their basic strategy was to polarize the electorate again around a handful of controversial ideas and their record while preventing opposition from rallying exclusively around the Liberals by undermining confidence in Liberal leader Dalton McGuinty. They ran a series of negative television ads against McGuinty in an attempt to brand him as "not up to the job". At the same time, they emphasized their economic record, while downplaying disruptions in health care and education as part of a needed reorganization of public services that promoted efficiency and would lead to eventual improvements.

Both campaigns proved highly successful and the principal architects of those campaigns had been dubbed the "whiz kids" by the press. David Lindsay, Mike Harris's chief of staff, was responsible for the overall integration of policy, communications, campaign planning and transition to government while Mitch Patten served as campaign secretary. Tom Long and Leslie Noble jointly ran the campaigns, with Long serving as campaign chair and Noble as campaign manager. Paul Rhodes, a former reporter, was responsible for media relations. Deb Hutton was Mike Harris's right arm as executive assistant. Jaime Watt and Perry Miele worked on the advertising. Guy Giorno worked on policy and speechwriting in 1995 and in 1999 was in charge of overall messaging.  Scott Munnoch was tour director and Glen Wright rode the leader's bus. Future leader John Tory worked on fundraising and debate prep, and was actually one of two people (the other was John Matheson) to play Liberal leader Dalton McGuinty during preparation for the 1999 leaders' debate. (Andy Brandt and Giorno played NDP leader Howard Hampton.)

Heading into 2003, Tom Long refused to work for Ernie Eves. Most speculated that Long saw Eves as too wishy-washy and not enough of a traditional hard-right conservative. Jaime Watt took Long's position as campaign co-chair and more or less all the same players settled into the same places. A few new faces included Jeff Bangs as campaign manager. Bangs was a long-time Eves loyalist who had grown up in his riding of Parry Sound.

The Progressive Conservatives once again planned on polarizing the electorate around a handful of hot button campaign pledges. However, with their party and government listing in public opinion polls, they found their only strong contrasts were around the experience and stature of Premier Eves. Their campaign slogan "Experience You Can Trust" was designed to highlight Eves' years in office.

The party platform, dubbed "The Road Ahead", was longer and broader than in earlier years.  Five main planks would emerge for the campaign:

 Tax deductions for mortgage payments.
 Rebate seniors the education portion of their property taxes.
 Tax credits for parents sending their children to private schools.
 Banning teachers' strikes by sending negotiations to binding arbitration.
 A "Made-in-Ontario" immigration system.

Each plank was targeted at a key Tory voting bloc: homeowners, seniors, religious conservatives, parents and law-and-order types.

Eves' campaigning followed a straightforward pattern. Eves would highlight one of the five elements of the platform and then attack Dalton McGuinty for opposing it. For instance, he would visit the middle-class home of a visible minority couple with two kids and talk about how much money they would get under his mortgage deductibility plan. That would be followed by an attack on McGuinty for having a secret plan to raise their taxes. Or he would campaign in a small town assembly plant and talk about how under a "Made-in-Ontario" immigration plan fewer new Canadians would settle in Toronto and more outside the city, helping the plant manager with his labour shortage. Then he would link McGuinty to Prime Minister of Canada Jean Chrétien and say McGuinty supported the federal immigration system that allows terrorists and criminals into the country.

The Tory television advertising also attempted to polarize the election around these issues.

In one of the ads, a voice-over accompanying an unflattering photo of the Liberal leader asks "Ever wonder why Dalton McGuinty wants to raise your taxes?" The ad then points out that McGuinty has opposed Tory plans to allow homeowners a tax deduction on mortgage interest and to give senior citizens a break on their property taxes.

In another ad, the voice-over asks "Doesn't he (McGuinty) know that a child's education is too important to be disrupted by lockouts and strikes?" It says that McGuinty has sided with the unions and rejected the Tory proposal to ban teacher strikes.

Both ads end with the attack "He's still not up to the job."

Armed with a majority, the Tories were hoping to hold the seats they already had, while targeting a handful of rural Liberal seats in hopes of increasing their majority. They campaigned relatively little in Northern Ontario, with the exception of North Bay and Parry Sound, both of which they held.

Liberal campaign
The first half of Dalton McGuinty's 1999 campaign was widely criticized as disorganized and uninspired, and most journalists believe he gave a poor performance in the leaders' debate. However, McGuinty was able to rally his party in the last ten days. On election day, the Liberals won 40% of the vote, their second best showing in almost fifty years. Perhaps more importantly, nine new MPPs were elected, boosting the caucus from 30 to 35, including dynamic politicians like George Smitherman and Michael Bryant.

In 1999, the Liberal strategy had been to polarize the electorate between Mike Harris and Dalton McGuinty. They purposely put out a platform that was devoid of ideas, to ensure the election was about the Tory record, and not the Liberal agenda. To an extent, they succeeded. Support for the NDP collapsed from 21% to just 13%, while the Liberals climbed 9%. However, while they almost cornered the market of those angry at the Tories, they could not convince enough people to be angry at the Tories to win.

The night he conceded defeat, McGuinty was already planning how to win the next election. He set out the themes that the Liberals would build into their next platform. Liberals, he said, would offer "some of those things that Ontarians simply have to be able to count on - good schools, good hospitals, good health care, good education and something else.... We want to bring an end to fighting so we can finally start working together."

McGuinty replaced many of his young staff with experienced political professionals he recruited. The three he kept in key positions were Don Guy, his campaign manager and a pollster with Pollara, Matt Maychak, his director of communications, and Bob Lopinski, his director of issues management. To develop his platform, he added to this a new chief of staff, Phil Dewan, a former policy director for Premier David Peterson and Ottawa veteran Gerald M. Butts. He also sought out Peterson-era Ontario Minister of Labour Greg Sorbara to run for president of the Ontario Liberal Party.

Early on, McGuinty set down three strategic imperatives. First, no tax cuts. This ran against the conventional wisdom of politics that it was necessary to offer tax cuts to win; everyone from Mike Harris to Bill Clinton had campaigned on reducing the tax burden on the middle class. But McGuinty was determined that Ontario voters would accept that the money was needed to restore public health care and education services. Second, a positive tone. McGuinty wanted to avoid the typical opposition leader role of automatically opposing whatever the government announced, and instead, set the agenda with positive alternatives. While attacking the opponent was important, that would be left to caucus surrogates. Third, one big team. At the time, the Ontario Liberal Party was riven into factions. Peterson-era people distrusted more recent arrivals. Jean Chrétien supporters fought with Paul Martin supporters. McGuinty set a tone that divisions were left at the door.

The emphasis on building the team was highly successful as job that in 1999 were done by one person were now assigned to groups of four or six or eight.  Dewan brought on board veterans of the Peterson regime such as Sheila James, Vince Borg and David MacNaughton. From Ottawa, campaign veterans such as Warren Kinsella, Derek Kent and Gordon Ashworth signed on to help oust the Ontario Tories from power.

The Liberal strategy was the same as in 1999: polarize the election between the Conservatives and Liberals to marginalize the NDP and then convince enough voters that the Conservatives had to go. With polls showing more than 60% of voters reporting it was "time for a change", the Liberals campaign theme was "choose change". The theme summarized the two-step strategy perfectly: first, boil the election down to a two-party choice and then cast the Liberals as a capable and trustworthy agent of change at a time when voters were fed up with the government.

After the sparse platform of 1999, the 2003 Liberal platform was a sprawling omnibus of public policy crossing five main policy booklets, three supplements aimed at specific geographic or industrial groups and a detailed costing exercise. The principle planks that were highlighted in the election were:

 Freezing taxes and balancing the books.
 Improving test scores and lowering class sizes in public schools.
 Reducing wait times for key health services.
 Improving environmental protection and quality of life.
 Repairing the divisions of the Harris-Eves era.

McGuinty backed up his comprehensive platform with a meticulous costing by a forensic account and two bank economists. While the Conservatives had adopted a third-party verification in 1995, they did not in 2003, allowing the Liberals to gain credibility that they could pay for their promises.

In contrast to the Eves campaign, where the leader was both positive and negative message carrier, the Liberals used a number of caucus members to criticize the Harris-Eves government while McGuinty was free to promote his positive plan for change.

The Liberal advertising strategy was highly risky. While conventional wisdom says the only way to successfully respond to a negative campaign is with even more negative ads against the opponent, McGuinty ran only positive ads for the duration of the campaign.

In the pre-writ period, the Liberal advertising featured Dalton McGuinty speaking to the camera, leaning against a tree while snow falls, saying "People hear me say that I'll fix our hospitals and fix our schools and yet keep taxes down. Am I an optimist? Maybe. What I'm not is cynical, or jaded, or tired. I don't owe favours to special interests or old friends or political cronies. Together, we can make Ontario the envy of the world, once again. And, I promise you this, no one will work harder than I will to create that Ontario."

During the first stage of the campaign, the principal Liberal ad featured a tight close-up of Dalton McGuinty as he spoke about his plans for Ontario. In the key line of the first ad, McGuinty looks into the camera and says "I won't cut your taxes, but I'm not going to raise them either."

Geographically, the Liberal campaign was able to rest on a solid core of seats in Toronto and Northern Ontario that were at little risk at the beginning of the election period. They had to defend a handful of rural seats that had been recently won and were targeted by the PCs. However, the principle battlefield of the election was in PC-held territory in the "905" region of suburbs around Toronto, particularly Peel and York districts, suburban seats around larger cities like Ottawa and Hamilton and in Southwestern Ontario in communities like London, Kitchener-Waterloo and Guelph.

NDP campaign
The 1999 NDP campaign received its lowest level of popular support since the Second World War, earning just 12.6% of the vote and losing party status with just nine seats. Several factors led to this poor showing, including a lacklustre campaign, Hampton's low profile, and a movement called strategic voting that endorsed voting for the Liberals in most ridings in order to remove the governing Tories. After the election, there was a short-lived attempt to remove leader Howard Hampton publicly led by leaders of the party's youth wing.  However, the majority of party members blamed the defeat on NDP supporters voting Liberal in hopes of removing Harris and the Tories from power. As a result, Hampton was not widely blamed for this severe defeat and stayed on as leader.

Under the rules of the Legislative Assembly, a party would receive "official party status", and the resources and privileges accorded to officially recognized parties, if it had 12 or more seats; thus, the NDP would lose caucus funding and the ability to ask questions in the House. However, the governing Conservatives changed the rules after the election to lower the threshold for party status from 12 seats to 8. The Tories argued that since Ontario's provincial ridings now had the same boundaries as the federal ones, the threshold should be lowered to accommodate the smaller legislature. Others argued that the Tories were only helping the NDP so they could continue to split the vote with the Liberals.

During the period before the election, Hampton identified the Conservative plan for deregulating and privatizing electricity generation and transmission as the looming issue of the next election. With the Conservatives holding a firm market-oriented line and the Liberal position muddled, Hampton boldly focused the party's Question Period and research agendas almost exclusively on energy issues. Hampton quickly distinguished himself as a passionate advocate of maintaining public ownership of electricity generation, and published a book on the subject, Public Power, in 2003.

With the selection of Eves as the PC leader, the NDP hoped that the government's move to the centre in the spring of 2002 would reduce the polarization of the Ontario electorate between the PCs and Liberals and improve the NDP's standing. It was also hoped that the long-standing split between labour and the NDP would be healed as the bitter legacy of the Rae government faded.

The co-chairs of the NDP campaign were Diane O'Reggio, newly installed as the party's provincial secretary after a stint in Ottawa working for the federal party, and Andre Foucault, secretary-treasurer of the Communications Energy and Paperworkers union. The manager was Rob Milling, principal secretary to Hampton. Communications were handled by Sheila White and Gil Hardy. Jeff Ferrier was the media coordinator.

The NDP strategy was to present itself as distinct from the Liberals on the issue of public ownership of public services, primarily in electricity and health care, while downplaying any significant differences between the Liberals and PCs. There was a conscious effort to discourage "strategic voting" where NDP supporters vote Liberal to defeat the Conservatives. The NDP slogan was "publicpower", designed to highlight both the energy issue Hampton had championed and public health care, while promoting a populist image of empowerment for average people.

The NDP campaign was designed to be highly visual and memorable. Each event was built around a specific visual thematic. For instance, in the first week of the campaign, Hampton attacked the Liberal energy platform saying it was "full of holes" and holding up a copy of the platform with oversized holes punched in it. He also illustrated it "had more holes than Swiss cheese" by also displaying a large block of cheese. At another event, Hampton and his campaign team argued that the Liberal positions were like "trying to nail Jello to the wall" by literally attempting to nail Jello to a wall. Hampton also made an appearance in front of the Toronto home of millionaire Peter Munk to denounce Eves' tax breaks, claiming that they would save Munk $18,000 a year.

The first round of NDP ads avoided personal attacks, and cast leader Howard Hampton as a champion of public utilities. In one 30-second spot, Mr. Hampton talks about the effects of privatization of the power industry and the blackout. "For most of us, selling off our hydro was the last straw," he says. The clip is mixed with images of Toronto streets during power failure.

Geographically, the NDP campaign focused on targeting seats in Scarborough and Etobicoke in Toronto, Hamilton, Ottawa and Northern Ontario.

Campaign events

Early weeks
The first week of the campaign was dominated by the Conservatives, who launched a series of highly negative attacks at Liberal leader Dalton McGuinty while highlighting popular elements of their platform. On the first week of the campaign, two polls showed a tight race: a poll done by EKOS for the Toronto Star showed a 1.5% Liberal lead, while a smaller poll done by COMPAS showed a 5% Liberal lead. A poll done by Environics in late June and early July showed a 13-point lead for the Liberals.

As the campaign entered week 2, it was anticipated that the Liberals would push a series of highly negative ads to combat advertising by the Conservatives that attacked Dalton McGuinty. Instead, they went positive and stayed positive throughout the campaign. It was Eves who went on the defensive as the Liberals worked the media to put the Premier on his heels. Stung by years of arrogance by the PC Party toward reporters, the media were quick to pile on.

After the Liberals Gerry Phillips and Gerald M. Butts accused Eves of having no plan to pay for his $10.4 billion in promises, Eves stumbled when he could not provide his own cost for his promises. "I couldn't tell you off the top of my head", he admitted. Then came a story on the front of the Globe and Mail saying that Ontarians would have to pay "millions" in extra premiums because the election call had delayed implementation of new auto insurance regulations promised by Eves on the eve of the campaign. On Wednesday the government was broadsided when – days after a raid at a meat packing plant exposed the sorry state of public health at some abattoirs – leaked documents showed the PC government had been sitting on recommendations to improve meat safety, leading to calls for a public inquiry by the opposition parties. The issue was made worse when Agriculture Minister Helen Johns refused all media calls and had to be literally tracked down in her riding by reporters.

On Thursday, according to the Green party candidate in Nipissing (Mike Harris' old riding), a donor with Tory connections offered him money to bolster his campaign and draw votes away from the Liberals. The allegations were denied by the Tories. The same day, Eves attacked Dalton McGuinty for voting against a bill to protect taxpayers from increased taxes, when it turns out McGuinty in fact voted for that bill.

The "Kitten-eater" controversy
On September 12, the Eves campaign issued a news release that called Dalton McGuinty an "evil reptilian kitten-eater from another planet". The words appeared at the end of the news release. Eves said the epithet was meant as a joke, and acknowledged the words were "over the top", but refused to apologize.

There is speculation the epithet was an obscure reference to an episode of Buffy the Vampire Slayer, which McGuinty stated, in a blog post that week, he enjoys watching.

In response, McGuinty said his campaign will not be "sidetracked" by the incident. Despite efforts by two Conservative spies at a Liberal campaign event to shoo away a white kitten, members of the media managed to take photographs of McGuinty holding the kitten, a moment some described as a defining moment of the campaign.

Liberal Party officials made T-shirts that were emblazoned with the words "Call Me An Evil Reptilian Kitten Eater ... But I Want Change". The T-shirts were handed out to party supporters at a rally held that same night.

Later weeks
The Conservatives spent the third week on the defensive and dropping in the polls, unable to recover from the disasters of the second week and fresh new attacks. The Liberals produced documents from the Walkerton Inquiry showing that individual Conservative MPPs were warned about risks to human health and safety resulting from cuts to the Environment Ministry budget. An attack on Dalton McGuinty saying he needed "professional help" forced an apology from the Conservatives to people with mental illness. Tory MPP John O'Toole said the Tory negative campaign was a mistake, putting Eves on the defensive once again. A leaked memo was used by the opposition to accuse the government of threatening public sector workers into not telling the truth at a public inquiry into the government's handling of the SARS crisis. Eves ended the week with another event that backfired, brandishing barbed wire and a get out of jail free card to attack the Liberals as soft on crime. Reporters spent more time focused on Eves' first use of props in the election than on his message.

By the fourth week of the campaign, polls showed the Liberals pulling away from the Conservatives with a margin of at least 10 points. It was widely believed that only a disastrous performance in the leader's debate stood between Dalton McGuinty and the Premier's Office. McGuinty - who had stumbled badly in the 1999 debate - was able to play off low expectations and a surprisingly low-key Eves to earn the draw he wanted. The debate itself was also subject to criticism from the Green Party of Ontario, which denounced a Canadian Radio-television and Telecommunications Commission decision not to allow leader Frank de Jong to participate.

The final week of the campaign was marred by more negative attacks from Eves and the Conservatives. At one point, Premier Eves referred to Mr. McGuinty as having a "pointy head", a remark he later conceded was inappropriate.  McGuinty was able to extend the bad press from the incident another day when he joked to radio hosts that they needed to be careful "so I won't spear you with my sharp pointy head."

McGuinty spent the last days of the campaign travelling through previously rock solid PC territory in ridings like Durham, Simcoe and Leeds-Grenville to large crowds.

Issues
The campaign was contentious on the issues as well, with both the Liberals and Howard Hampton's New Democrats attacking the Tories' record in office. Various scandals and other unpopular moves reduced public opinion of the Tories going into the race, including the Walkerton water tragedy, the deaths of Dudley George and Kimberly Rogers, the possible sale of publicly owned electric utility Hydro One, the SARS outbreak, the decision to release the 2003 budget at an auto parts factory instead of the Legislature, the widespread blackout in August, and the Aylmer packing plant tainted meat investigation. As one Tory insider put it: "So many chickens came to roost, it's like a remake of The Birds".

One of the most contentious issues was education. All three parties pledged to increase spending by $2 billion, but Premier Eves also pledged to ban teacher strikes, lock-outs, and work-to-rule campaigns during the school year, a move the other parties rejected. Teacher strikes had plagued the previous Progressive Conservative mandate of Mike Harris, whose government had deeply cut education spending.

Tax cuts were also an issue. The Progressive Conservatives proposed a wide range of tax cuts, including a 20-percent cut to personal income taxes, and the elimination of education tax paid by seniors, two moves that would have cost $1.3 billion together. The Liberals and New Democrats rejected these cuts as profligate.  The Liberals also promised to cancel some pending Tory tax cuts and to eliminate some tax cuts already introduced.

Assessment

CBC Newsworld declared a Liberal victory minutes after ballot-counting began. Ernie Eves conceded defeat only ninety minutes into the count.

The Liberals won a huge majority with 72 seats, almost 70% of the 106-seat legislature. The Liberals not only won almost every seat in the city of Toronto, but every seat bordering on Toronto as well. All seven seats in Peel region went Liberal, as well as previously safe PC 905 seats such as Markham, Oakville and Pickering—Ajax. The Liberals also made a major breakthrough in Southwestern Ontario, grabbing all three seats in London as well as rural seats such as Perth–Middlesex, Huron–Bruce and Lambton–Kent. If the story of the PC majorities in 1995 and 1999 were the marriage of rural and small-town conservative bedrock with voters in the suburbs, the 2003 election was a divorce of those suburban voters from rural Ontario and a new marriage to the mid-town professionals and New Canadians who make up the Liberal base.

The NDP had a disappointingly confusing election: on one hand, they won seven seats, one fewer than the eight required to keep "official party status", which would give it a share of official Queen's Park staff, money for research, and guaranteed time during Question Period. On the other hand, they increased their share of the popular vote for the first time since 1990. Despite the mixed results, Hampton stayed on as party leader, saying that the party did not blame him for the poor performance. The party was returned to official party status seven months into the session, when Andrea Horwath won a by-election in Hamilton East on May 13, 2004.

The Tories were completely shut out of Toronto, where 19 out of 22 ridings were won by the Liberals, and the remaining three were carried by the New Democrats. Perhaps more ominously for the PCs, they were also shut out of any seats bordering Toronto; only in the outermost suburbs like Aurora and Whitby were high-profile PC cabinet ministers able to retain their seats. With the arguable exception of Elizabeth Witmer, no PC member represented an urban riding.

The 38th Parliament of Ontario opened on November 19, 2003 at 3 p.m. Eastern Time with a Throne Speech in which the McGuinty government laid out their agenda.

Student vote
High school students in every riding in Ontario were allowed to cast ballots in their classrooms as part of a student vote, although their numbers did not count in the official election. 93 ridings favoured the Liberals in the student vote, nine favoured the New Democrats, and one favoured the Greens, while the Conservatives were shut out. There was also a vote for elementary students.

Provincial results

Notes:

1 "Before" refers to the party standings in the Legislature at the end of the legislative session, and not to the standings at the previous election.

2 Richard Butson was the sole candidate for the Confederation of Regions Party.

3Ten candidates ran as "Independent Renewal" candidates.  This was the Marxist-Leninist Party under another name.

4Candidates from the Independent Reform Party and Communist League also ran as independents.

5Costas Manios ran as an "Independent Liberal" candidate after being denied the opportunity to run for the Liberal Party nomination in Scarborough Centre.  Outgoing MPP Claudette Boyer had sat in the house as an "Independent Liberal" from 2001 to 2003.

It is possible that some other candidates listed on the ballot as independents ran for unregistered parties.The following table gives the number of seats each party won, and the number of ridings in which each party came second, third, and fourth:

Riding results

Ottawa

|-
|bgcolor=whitesmoke|Nepean—Carleton
|
|Rod Vanier 20,878 (35.65%)
||
|John Baird  31,662 (54.06%)
|
|Liam McCarthy 3,828 (6.54%)
|
|Matt Takach 2,200 (3.76%)
|
| 
||
|John Baird
|-
|bgcolor=whitesmoke|Ottawa Centre
||
|Richard Patten 22,295 (45.1%)
|
|Joe Varner  11,217 (22.69%)
|
|Jeff Atkinson  11,362 (22.98%)
|
|Chris Bradshaw  3,821 (7.73%)
|
|Stuart Ryan (Comm)306 (0.62%)Matt Szymanowicz (F)218 (0.44%)Fakhry Guirguis (Ind)214 (0.43%)
||
|Richard Patten
|-
|bgcolor=whitesmoke|Ottawa—Orléans
||
|Phil McNeely  25,300 (50.36%)
|
|Brian Coburn  20,762 (41.32%)
|
|Ric Dagenais 2,778 (5.53%)
|
|Melanie Ransom1,402 (2.79%)
|
| 
||
|Brian Coburn
|-
|bgcolor=whitesmoke|Ottawa South
||
|Dalton McGuinty  24,647 (51.7%)
|
|Richard Raymond  16,413 (34.43%)
|
|James McLaren 4,306 (9.03%)
|
|David Chernushenko1,741 (3.65%)
|
|John Pacheco (FCP)562 (1.18%)
||
|Dalton McGuinty
|-
|bgcolor=whitesmoke|Ottawa—Vanier
||
|Madeleine Meilleur  22,188 (53.53%)
|
|Maurice Lamirande  10,878 (26.24%)
|
|Joseph Zebrowski 6,507 (15.7%)
|
|Raphael Thierrin1,876 (4.53%)
|
| 
||
|Claudette Boyer †
|-
|bgcolor=whitesmoke|Ottawa West—Nepean
||
|Jim Watson  23,127 (47.04%)
|
|Garry Guzzo  20,277 (41.24%)
|
|Marlene Rivier 4,099 (8.34%)
|
|Neil Adair1,309 (2.66%)
|
|Robert Gauthier (Ind)353 (0.72%)
||
|Garry Guzzo
|-
|}

Eastern Ontario

|-
|bgcolor=whitesmoke|Glengarry—Prescott—Russell
||
|Jean-Marc Lalonde  28,956
|
|Albert Bourdeau  10,921
|
|Guy Belle-Isle 2,544
|
|Louise Pattington1,471
|
| 
||
|Jean-Marc Lalonde
|-
|bgcolor=whitesmoke|Hastings—Frontenac—Lennox and Addington
||
|Leona Dombrowsky  21,548
|
|Barry Gordon 13,709
|
|Ross Sutherland 4,286
|
|Adam Scott1,311
|
|John-Henry Westen (FCP)673
||
|Leona Dombrowsky
|-
|bgcolor=whitesmoke|Kingston and the Islands
||
|John Gerretsen  28,877
|
|Hans Westenberg 9,640
|
|Janet Collins 5,514
|
|Eric Walton3,137
|
|Chris Beneteau (FCP)735
||
|John Gerretsen
|-
|bgcolor=whitesmoke|Lanark—Carleton
|
|Marianne Wilkinson 23,466 (38.79%)
||
|Norm Sterling  29,641 (48.99%)
|
|Jim Ronson 3,554 (5.87%)
|
|John Baranyi 2,564 (4.24%)
|
|Jim Gardiner (FCP) 1,275 (2.11%)
||
|Norm Sterling
|-
|bgcolor=whitesmoke|Leeds—Grenville
|
|Stephen Mazurek  17,667
||
|Bob Runciman  21,443
|
|Steve Armstrong 2,469
|
|Jerry Heath 1,799
|
|Melody Trolly (FCP)649
||
|Bob Runciman
|-
|bgcolor=whitesmoke|Prince Edward—Hastings
||
|Ernie Parsons  22,937
|
|John Williams 12,800
|
|Jodie Jenkins 3,377
|
|Joe Ross 628
|
|Trueman Tuck(F)229
||
|Ernie Parsons
|-
|bgcolor=whitesmoke|Renfrew—Nipissing—Pembroke
|
|Derek Nighbor  18,629
||
|John Yakabuski  19,274
|
|Felcite Stairs 5,092
|
|Chris Walker 671
|
| 
||
|Sean Conway †
|-
|bgcolor=whitesmoke|Stormont—Dundas—Charlottenburgh
||
|Jim Brownell  19,558
|
|Todd Lalonde  13,948
|
|Matt Sumegi  1,639
|
|Tom Manley  2,098
|
|Gary Besner (Ind)968
||
|John Cleary †
|-
|}

Central Ontario

|-
|bgcolor=whitesmoke|Barrie—Simcoe—Bradford
|
|Mike Ramsay 21,998
||
|Joe Tascona 31,529
|
|John Thomson 5,641
|
|Stewart Sinclair 1,278
|
|Roberto Sales (FCP) 441
||
|Joe Tascona
|-
|bgcolor=whitesmoke|Bruce—Grey—Owen Sound
|
|Dave Hocking14,881
||
|Bill Murdoch23,338
|
|Colleen Purdon4,159
|
|Martin Donald769
|
|Linda Freiburger (FCP)1,086Bill Cook(Ref)586
||
|Bill Murdoch
|-
|bgcolor=whitesmoke|Dufferin—Peel—Wellington—Grey
|
|Dan Yake14,859
||
|Ernie Eves29,222
|
|Mitchel Healey3,148
|
|Frank de Jong3,161
|
|Dave Davies (FCP)1,202
||
|Ernie Eves
|-
|bgcolor=whitesmoke|Durham
|
|Garry Minnie18,590
||
|John O'Toole23,814
|
|Teresa Williams6,274
|
|Gordon MacDonald1,183
|
|Cathy McKeever (F)707
||
|John O'Toole
|-
|bgcolor=whitesmoke|Haliburton—Victoria—Brock
|
|Jason Ward17,171
||
|Laurie Scott24,297
|
|Earl Manners7,884
|
|Douglas Smith1,183
|
|Paul Gordon (FCP)663Charles Olito (F)273
||
|Chris Hodgson †
|-
|bgcolor=whitesmoke|Northumberland
||
|Lou Rinaldi20,382
|
|Doug Galt17,816
|
|Murray Weppler5,210
|
|Derrick Kelly1,839
|
| 
||
|Doug Galt
|-
|bgcolor=whitesmoke|Peterborough
||
|Jeff Leal24,626
|
|Gary Stewart18,418
|
|Dave Nickle9,796
|
|Tim Holland1,605
|
|Max Murray (FCP)414Bob Bowers (Ind) 178
||
|Gary Stewart
|-
|bgcolor=whitesmoke|Simcoe—Grey
|
|Mark Redmond17,505
||
|Jim Wilson26,114
|
|Leo Losereit5,032
|
|Geoffrey Maile875
|
|Steven Taylor (FCP)801Philip Bender (Lbt)411
||
|Jim Wilson
|-
|bgcolor=whitesmoke|Simcoe North
|
|Paul Sloan19,713
||
|Garfield Dunlop23,393
|
|John Niddery5,515
|
|Nina Pruesse1,540
|
|Blaine Scott (FCP)453Karnail Singh (Ind)101
||
|Garfield Dunlop
|-
|bgcolor=whitesmoke|York North
|
|John Taylor21,054
||
|Julia Munro24,517
|
|Sylvia Gerl4,029
|
|Bob Burrows1,854
|
|Simone Williams (FCP)497
||
|Julia Munro
|-
|}

Southern Durham & York

|-
|bgcolor=whitesmoke|Markham
||
|Tony Wong27,253
|
|David Tsubouchi21,257
|
|Janice Hagan2,679
|
|Bernadette Manning824
|
|Patrick Redmond (FCP)697
||
|David Tsubouchi
|-
|bgcolor=whitesmoke|Oak Ridges
|
|Helena Jaczek31,026
||
|Frank Klees32,647
|
|Pamela Courtot4,464
|
|Steven Haylestrom1,821
|
| 
||
|Frank Klees
|-
|bgcolor=whitesmoke|Oshawa
|
|Chris Topple9,383
||
|Jerry Ouellette14,566
|
|Sid Ryan13,547
|
|Karen Tweedle636
|
|Paul McKeever (F) 518Dale Chilvers (FCP) 383
||
|Jerry Ouellette
|-
|bgcolor=whitesmoke|Pickering—Ajax—Uxbridge
||
|Wayne Arthurs24,970
|
|Janet Ecker23,960
|
|Vern Edwards3,690
|
|Adam Duncan1,946
|
| 
||
|Janet Ecker
|-
|bgcolor=whitesmoke|Thornhill
||
|Mario Racco21,419
|
|Tina Molinari20,623
|
|Laurie Orrett2,616
|
|Bridget Haworth705
|
|Lindsay King (F)304
||
|Tina Molinari
|-
|bgcolor=whitesmoke|Vaughan—King—Aurora
||
|Greg Sorbara36,928
|
|Carmine Iacono21,744
|
|Mike Seaward4,697
|
|Adrian Visentin2,412
|
| 
||
|Greg Sorbara
|-
|bgcolor=whitesmoke|Whitby—Ajax
|
|Dennis Fox22,593
||
|Jim Flaherty27,240
|
|Dan Edwards5,155
|
|Michael MacDonald1,375
|
| 
||
|Jim Flaherty
|-
|}

Downtown Toronto

|-
|bgcolor=whitesmoke|Beaches—East York
|
|Monica Purdy 10,070
|
|Angela Kennedy 8,157
||
|Michael Prue 21,239
|
|Tom Mason 1,995
|
| 
||
|Michael Prue
|-
|bgcolor=whitesmoke|Davenport
||
|Tony Ruprecht15,586
|
|Tom Smith1,977
|
|Jordan Berger7,243
|
|Mark O'Brien907
|
|David Senater (Ind)293Franz Cauchi (F)264 Nunzio Venuto (Lbt)233
||
|Tony Ruprecht
|-
|bgcolor=whitesmoke|Don Valley West
||
|Kathleen Wynne23,488
|
|David Turnbull17,394
|
|Ali Naqvi2,540
|
|Philip Hawkins1,239
|
| 
||
|David Turnbull
|-
|bgcolor=whitesmoke|Eglinton—Lawrence
||
|Mike Colle23,743
|
|Corinne Korzen 12,402
|
|Robin Alter 4,351
|
|Mark Viitala 1,236
|
| 
||
|Mike Colle
|-
|bgcolor=whitesmoke|Parkdale—High Park
||
|Gerard Kennedy23,008
|
|Stephen Snell 6,436
|
|Margo Duncan 6,275
|
|Neil Spiegel 2,758
|
|Stan Grzywna (FCP) 591Karin Larsen (Comm) 349John Steele (Comm League) 204Richard (Dick) Field (F)165
||
|Gerard Kennedy
|-
|bgcolor=whitesmoke|St. Paul's
||
|Michael Bryant 24,887
|
|Charis Kelso 11,203
|
|Julian Heller 6,740
|
|Peter Elgie 2,266
|
|Carol Leborg (F)354
||
|Michael Bryant
|-
|bgcolor=whitesmoke|Toronto Centre—Rosedale
||
|George Smitherman 23,872
|
|John Adams 9,968
|
|Gene Lara 9,112
|
|Gabriel Draven 1,739
|
|Philip Fernandez (Ind Renewal) 324Silvio Ursomarzo (F)218
||
|George Smitherman
|-
|bgcolor=whitesmoke|Toronto—Danforth
|
|Jim Davidson12,246
|
|George Sardelis 6,562
||
|Marilyn Churley18,253
|
|Michael Pilling 1,368
|
|Masood Atchekzai (FCP)217Mehmet Ali Yagiz (Ind) 73
||
|Marilyn Churley
|-
|bgcolor=whitesmoke|Trinity—Spadina
|
|Nellie Pedro12,927
|
|Helena Guergis 4,985
||
|Rosario Marchese 19,268
|
|Greg Laxton 2,362
|
|Judson Glober (Lbt)756Nick Lin (Ind Renewal)256
||
|Rosario Marchese
|-
|bgcolor=whitesmoke|York South—Weston
||
|Joseph Cordiano19,932
|
|Stephen Halicki 4,930
|
|Brian Donlevy 6,247
|
|Enrique Palad 794
|
|Mariangela Sanabria (FCP)475
||
|Joseph Cordiano
|-
|}

Suburban Toronto

|-
|bgcolor=whitesmoke|Don Valley East
||
|David Caplan21,327
|
|Paul Sutherland12,027
|
|Murphy Browne3,058
|
|Dan Craig558
|
|Ryan Kidd (FCP)460Wayne Simmons (F)119
||
|David Caplan
|-
|bgcolor=whitesmoke|Etobicoke Centre
||
|Donna Cansfield22,070
|
|Rose Andrachuk17,610
|
|Margaret Anne McHugh3,400
|
|Ralph M. Chapman1,584
|
| 
||
|Chris Stockwell †
|-
|bgcolor=whitesmoke|Etobicoke—Lakeshore
||
|Laurel Broten19,680
|
|Morley Kells14,524
|
|Irene Jones8,952
|
|Junyee Wang708
|
|Ted Kupiec (FCP)480Janice Murray (Ind Renewal)225
||
|Morley Kells
|-
|bgcolor=whitesmoke|Etobicoke North
||
|Shafiq Qaadri16,727
|
|Baljit Gosal6,978
|
|Kuldip Singh Sodhi3,516
|
|Mir Kamal503
|
|Frank Acri (Ind)1,990Teresa Ceolin (FCP)1,275
||
|John Hastings †
|-
|bgcolor=whitesmoke|Scarborough—Agincourt
||
|Gerry Phillips23,026
|
|Yolanda Chan11,337
|
|Stacy Douglas2,209
|
|Lawrence Arkilander566
|
|Tony Ieraci(FCP)550
||
|Gerry Phillips
|-
|bgcolor=whitesmoke|Scarborough Centre
||
|Brad Duguid21,698
|
|Marilyn Mushinski11,686
|
|Michael Laxer3,653
|
|Robert Carty642
|
|Costas Manios (Independent Liberal)3,259Joseph Internicola (FCP)495Elizabeth Rowley (Comm)241
||
|Marilyn Mushinski
|-
|bgcolor=whitesmoke|Scarborough East
||
|Mary Anne Chambers21,798
|
|Steve Gilchrist14,323
|
|Gary Dale5,250
|
|Hugh McNeil668
|
|Sam Apelbaum (Lbt) 285
||
|Steve Gilchrist
|-
|bgcolor=whitesmoke|Scarborough—Rouge River
||
|Alvin Curling23,976
|
|Kevin Moore9,468
|
|Jean-Paul Yovanoff2,246
|
|Karen Macdonald1,326
|
|Mitchell Persaud(FCP)536
||
|Alvin Curling
|-
|bgcolor=whitesmoke|Scarborough Southwest
||
|Lorenzo Berardinetti17,501
|
|Dan Newman11,826
|
|Barbara Warner6,688
|
|Andrew Strachan689
|
|Ray Scott (FCP)586
||
|Dan Newman
|-
|bgcolor=whitesmoke|Willowdale
||
|David Zimmer21,823
|
|David Young19,957
|
|Yvonne Bobb3,084
|
|Sharolyn Vettesse933
|
|Rina Morra (FCP)442Vaughan Byrnes (F)227
||
|David Young
|-
|bgcolor=whitesmoke|York Centre
||
|Monte Kwinter18,808
|
|Dan Cullen7,826
|
|Matthew Norrish3,494
|
|Constantine Kritsonis1,496
|
| 
||
|Monte Kwinter
|-
|bgcolor=whitesmoke|York West
||
|Mario Sergio16,102
|
|Ted Aver2,330
|
|Garth Bobb3,954
|
|Richard Von Fuchs437
|
|Christopher Black (Comm)408
||
|Mario Sergio
|-
|}

Brampton, Mississauga & Oakville

|-
|bgcolor=whitesmoke|
Bramalea—Gore—Malton—Springdale
||
|Kuldip Kular19,306
|
|Raminder Gill15,549
|
|Cesar Martello4,931
|
|Ernst Braendli1,176
|
|Frank Chilelli (Ind Renewal)868Howard Cukoff (Comm)503
||
|Raminder Gill
|-
|bgcolor=whitesmoke|Brampton Centre
||
|Linda Jeffrey16,661
|
|Joe Spina15,656
|
|Kathy Pounder 4,827
|
|Sanjeev Goel  820
|
|Wally Dove (F)356
||
|Joe Spina
|-
|bgcolor=whitesmoke|Brampton West—Mississauga
||
|Vic Dhillon 28,926
|
|Tony Clement26,414
|
|Chris Moise5,103
|
|Paul Simas811
|
|Paul Micelli (FCP)1,122John G. Purdy (F)266
||
|Tony Clement
|-
|bgcolor=whitesmoke|Mississauga Centre
||
|Harinder Takhar 18,466
|
|Rob Sampson15,846
|
|Michael Miller3,237
|
|Jeffrey Scott Smith776
|
|John R. Lyall (FCP)588
||
|Rob Sampson
|-
|bgcolor=whitesmoke|Mississauga East
||
|Peter Fonseca 16,686
|
|Carl DeFaria13,382
|
|Michael Hancock2,479
|
|Donald Barber666
|
|Gary Nail (FCP)358Pierre Chenier (Ind Renewal)256
||
|Carl DeFaria
|-
|bgcolor=whitesmoke|Mississauga South
||
|Tim Peterson17,211
|
|Margaret Marland16,977
|
|Ken Cole3,606
|
|Pamela Murray949
|
|Alfred Zawadzki (FCP)555
||
|Margaret Marland
|-
|bgcolor=whitesmoke|Mississauga West
||
|Bob Delaney27,903
|
|Nina Tangri20,406
|
|Arif Raza4,196
|
|Richard Pereira1,395
|
|Charles Montano (FCP)989
||
|John Snobelen †
|-
|bgcolor=whitesmoke|Oakville
||
|Kevin Flynn22,428
|
|Kurt Franklin18,991
|
|Anwar Naqvi2,858
|
| 
|
|Theresa Tritt (FCP)751
||
|Gary Carr †
|-
|}

Hamilton, Burlington & Niagara

|-
|bgcolor=whitesmoke|Ancaster—Dundas—Flamborough—Aldershot
||
|Ted McMeekin23,045
|
|Mark Mullins18,141
|
|Kelly Hayes 5,666
|
|Brian Elder Sullivan 903
|
|Michael Trolly (FCP)434Richard Butson (CoR)293
||
|Ted McMeekin
|-
|bgcolor=whitesmoke|Burlington
|
|Mark Fuller19,654
||
|Cam Jackson21,506
|
|David Laird3,832
|
|Julie Gordon1,086
|
|Vic Corvaro (FCP)523
||
|Cam Jackson
|-
|bgcolor=whitesmoke|Erie—Lincoln
|
|Vance Badawey16,290
||
|Tim Hudak20,348
|
|Julius Antal3,950
|
|Tom Ferguson713
|
|Steve Elgersma (FCP)666
||
|Tim Hudak
|-
|bgcolor=whitesmoke|Halton
|
|Barbara Sullivan28,112
||
|Ted Chudleigh33,610
|
|Jay Jackson5,587
|
|Matthew Raymond Smith1,295
|
|Giuseppe Gori (FCP)1,123
||
|Ted Chudleigh
|-
|bgcolor=whitesmoke|Hamilton East
||
|Dominic Agostino16,015
|
|Sohail Bhatti4,033
|
|Bob Sutton9,035
|
|Raymond Dartsch563
|
|Bob Mann (Comm) 380Kelly Greenaway (Ind Renewal)378Michael Izzotti (FCP) 304
||
|Dominic Agostino
|-
|bgcolor=whitesmoke|Hamilton Mountain
||
|Marie Bountrogianni23,524
|
|Shakil Hassan8,637
|
|Chris Charlton12,017
|
|Selwyn Inniss494
|
|Eleanor Johnson (FCP)748
||
|Marie Bountrogianni
|-
|bgcolor=whitesmoke|Hamilton West
||
|Judy Marsales15,600
|
|Doug Brown8,185
|
|Roy Adams13,468
|
|Jo Pavlov727
|
|Lynne Scime (FCP)750Jamilé Ghaddar (Ind Renewal)303
||
|David Christopherson †
|-
|bgcolor=whitesmoke|Niagara Centre
|
|Henry D'Angela12,526
|
|Ann Gronski10,336
||
|Peter Kormos23,289
|
|Jordan McArthur768
|
| 
||
|Peter Kormos
|-
|bgcolor=whitesmoke|Niagara Falls
||
|Kim Craitor18,904
|
|Bart Maves15,353
|
|Claude Sonier4,962
|
|Ryan McLaughlin1,124
|
| 
||
|Bart Maves
|-
|bgcolor=whitesmoke|St. Catharines
||
|Jim Bradley25,319
|
|Mark Brickell12,932
|
|John Bacher3,944
|
|Jim Fannon1,167
|
|Linda Klassen (FCP)714
||
|Jim Bradley
|-
|bgcolor=whitesmoke|Stoney Creek
||
|Jennifer Mossop24,751
|
|Brad Clark19,517
|
|Lorrie McKibbon5,419
|
|Richard Safka898
|
| 
||
|Brad Clark
|-
|}

Midwestern Ontario

|-
|bgcolor=whitesmoke|Brant
||
|Dave Levac24,236
|
|Alayne Sokoloski13,618
|
|David Noonan5,262
|
|Mike Clancy1,014
|
|John Turmel (Ind)295
||
|Dave Levac
|-
|bgcolor=whitesmoke|Cambridge
|
|Jerry Boyle16,559
||
|Gerry Martiniuk19,996
|
|Pam Wolf8,513
|
|Michael Chownyk983
|
|Al Smith (FCP)1,001
||
|Gerry Martiniuk
|-
|bgcolor=whitesmoke|Guelph—Wellington
||
|Liz Sandals23,607
|
|Brenda Elliott20,735
|
|James Valcke6,745
|
|Ben Polley3,917
|
|Alan John McDonald (FCP)914
||
|Brenda Elliott
|-
|bgcolor=whitesmoke|Haldimand—Norfolk—Brant
|
|Rob Esselment17,151
||
|Toby Barrett20,109
|
|Paul Steiner4,720
|
|Graeme Dunn1,088
|
|Barra Gots (FCP)548
||
|Toby Barrett
|-
|bgcolor=whitesmoke|Huron—Bruce
||
|Carol Mitchell19,879
|
|Helen Johns16,594
|
|Grant Robertson4,973
|
|Shelley Hannah934
|
|Dave Joslin (FCP)902Robert Sabharwal (F)127
||
|Helen Johns
|-
|bgcolor=whitesmoke|Kitchener Centre
||
|John Milloy18,280
|
|Wayne Wettlaufer16,210
|
|Ted Martin6,781
|
|Luigi D'Agnillo1,728
|
| 
||
|Wayne Wettlaufer
|-
|bgcolor=whitesmoke|Kitchener—Waterloo
|
|Sean Strickland22,456
||
|Elizabeth Witmer23,957
|
|Dan Lajoie6,084
|
|Pauline Richards1,774
|
|Lou Reitzel (FCP)949Owen Alastair Ferguson (Ind)242Julian Ichim (Ind Renewal)153
||
|Elizabeth Witmer
|-
|bgcolor=whitesmoke|Oxford
|
|Brian Brown16,135
||
|Ernie Hardeman18,656
|
|Shawn Rouse5,318
|
|Tom Mayberry838
|
|Andre De Decker (FCP)689Paul Blair (F)404Kaye Sargent (Lbt)306
||
|Ernie Hardeman
|-
|bgcolor=whitesmoke|Perth—Middlesex
||
|John Wilkinson17,017
|
|Bert Johnson15,680
|
|Jack Verhulst4,703
|
|John Cowling1,201
|
|Pat Bannon (FCP)857Robert Smink (F)384
||
|Bert Johnson
|-
|bgcolor=whitesmoke|Waterloo—Wellington
|
|Deborah Whale17,344
||
|Ted Arnott22,550
|
|Richard Walsh Bowers3,970
|
|Allan Strong1,203
|
|Gord Truscott (FCP)978
||
|Ted Arnott
|}

Southwestern Ontario

|-
|bgcolor=whitesmoke|Chatham-Kent—Essex
||
|Pat Hoy23,022
|
|Dave Wilkinson11,586
|
|Derry McKeever2,893
|
|Jim Burgess1,069
|
|David Rodman (F)281
||
|Pat Hoy
|-
|bgcolor=whitesmoke|Elgin—Middlesex—London
||
|Steve Peters 24,914
|
|Bruce Smith13,149
|
|Bryan Bakker4,063
|
|Mark Viitala1,236
|
|Ray Monteith (F)671
||
|Steve Peters
|-
|bgcolor=whitesmoke|Essex
||
|Bruce Crozier20,559
|
|Patrick O'Neil11,234
|
|Pat Hayes12,614
|
|Darren J. Brown998
|
| 
||
|Bruce Crozier
|-
|bgcolor=whitesmoke|Lambton—Kent—Middlesex
||
|Maria Van Bommel18,533
|
|Marcel Beaubien15,060
|
|Joyce Jolliffe4,523
|
|Tim Van Bodegom1,133
|
|James Armstrong (Ind)1,053Wayne Forbes (F)780
||
|Marcel Beaubien
|-
|bgcolor=whitesmoke|London North Centre
||
|Deb Matthews20,212
|
|Dianne Cunningham13,460
|
|Rebecca Coulter11,414
|
|Bronagh Joyce Morgan780
|
|Craig Smith (FCP)432Lisa Turner (F)242
||
|Dianne Cunningham
|-
|bgcolor=whitesmoke|London—Fanshawe
||
|Khalil Ramal13,920
|
|Frank Mazzilli11,777
|
|Irene Mathyssen12,051
|
|Bryan Smith568
|
|Mike Davidson (F)493
||
|Frank Mazzilli
|-
|bgcolor=whitesmoke|London West
||
|Chris Bentley25,581
|
|Bob Wood15,463
|
|Patti Dalton7,403
|
|Laura Wythe805
|
|Bill Frampton (F)460
||
|Bob Wood
|-
|bgcolor=whitesmoke|Sarnia—Lambton
||
|Caroline Di Cocco18,179
|
|Henk Vanden Ende11,852
|
|Glenn Sonier6,482
|
|Bradley Gray1,414
|
|Andrew Falby (F)316
||
|Caroline Di Cocco
|-
|bgcolor=whitesmoke|Windsor—St. Clair
||
|Dwight Duncan19,692
|
|Matt Bufton4,162
|
|Madeline Crnec10,433
|
|Chris Holt1,315
|
|Saroj Bains (Ind Renewal)253
||
|Dwight Duncan
|-
|bgcolor=whitesmoke|Windsor West
||
|Sandra Pupatello21,993
|
|Derek Insley4,187
|
|Yvette Blackburn7,383
|
|Cary M. Lucier1,233
|
|Enver Villamizar (Ind Renewal)386
||
|Sandra Pupatello
|}

Northern Ontario

|-
|bgcolor=whitesmoke|Algoma—Manitoulin
||
|Mike Brown14,520
|
|Terry McCutcheon5,168
|
|Peter Denley9,459
|
|Ron Yurick680
|
| 
||
|Mike Brown
|-
|bgcolor=whitesmoke|Kenora—Rainy River
|
|Geoff McClain6,746
|
|Cathe Hoszowski 3,343
||
|Howard Hampton15,666
|
|Dan King305
|
| 
||
|Howard Hampton
|-
|bgcolor=whitesmoke|Nickel Belt
|
|Alex McCauley13,759
|
|Dave Kilgour4,804
||
|Shelley Martel16,567
|
|Robert Nevin479
|
| 
||
|Shelley Martel
|-
|bgcolor=whitesmoke|Nipissing
||
|Monique Smith18,003
|
|Al McDonald14,978
|
|Terry O'Connor2,613
|
|Jaimie Board528
|
| 
||
|Al McDonald
|-
|bgcolor=whitesmoke|Parry Sound—Muskoka
|
|Dan Waters13,332
||
|Norm Miller18,776
|
|Jo-Anne Boulding3,838
|
|Glen Hodgson2,277
|
|Charlene Phinney (FCP)484
||
|Norm Miller
|-
|bgcolor=whitesmoke|Sault Ste. Marie
||
|David Orazietti20,050
|
|Bruce Willson2,674
|
|Tony Martin11,379
|
|Dan Brosemer441
|
|Al Walker (FCP)606
||
|Tony Martin
|-
|bgcolor=whitesmoke|Sudbury
||
|Rick Bartolucci24,631
|
|Mila Wong5,068
|
|Harvey Wyers4,999
|
|Luke Norton1,009
|
| 
||
|Rick Bartolucci
|-
|bgcolor=whitesmoke|Thunder Bay—Atikokan
||
|Bill Mauro17,735
|
|Brian McKinnon5,365
|
|John Rafferty6,582
|
|Kristin Boyer762
|
| 
||
|Lyn McLeod †
|-
|bgcolor=whitesmoke|Thunder Bay—Superior North
||
|Michael Gravelle21,938
|
|Brent Sylvester2,912
|
|Bonnie Satten4,548
|
|Carl Rose882
|
| 
||
|Michael Gravelle
|-
|bgcolor=whitesmoke|Timiskaming—Cochrane
||
|David Ramsay18,499
|
|Rick Brassard6,330
|
|Ben Lefebvre5,741
|
|Paul Palmer489
|
| 
||
|David Ramsay
|-
|bgcolor=whitesmoke|Timmins—James Bay
|
|Michael Doody12,373
|
|Merv Russell2,527
||
|Gilles Bisson14,941
|
|Marsha Kriss219
|
| 
||
|Gilles Bisson
|}

By-elections
Ten by-elections were held between the 2003 and 2007 elections.

|-
| style="background:whitesmoke;"|Hamilton EastMay 13, 2004
|
|Ralph Agostino6,362
|
|Tara Crugnale1,772
||
|Andrea Horwath15,185
|
|Raymond Dartsch449
|
|John Turmel (Ind)122
||
|Dominic Agostinodied March 24, 2004
|-
| style="background:whitesmoke;"|Dufferin—Peel—Wellington—GreyMarch 17, 2005
|
|Bob Duncanson4,621
||
|John Tory15,633
|
|Lynda McDougall3,891
|
|Frank de Jong2,767
|
|Paul Micelli (FCP)488Bill Cook (Ind)164Philip Bender (Lbt)135)John Turmel (Ind)88
||
|Ernie Evesresigned February 1, 2005
|-
| style="background:whitesmoke;"|Scarborough—Rouge RiverNovember 24, 2005
||
|Bas Balkissoon9,347
|
|Cynthia Lai4,032
|
|Sheila White2,425
|
|Steven Toman167
|
|Alan Mercer (Lbt)100Rina Morra (FCP)93Wayne Simmons (F)59
||
|Alvin Curlingresigned August 19, 2005
|-
| style="background:whitesmoke;"|Toronto—DanforthMarch 30, 2006
|
|Ben Chin10,636
|
|Georgina Blanas2,713
||
|Peter Tabuns13,064
|
|Paul Charbonneau582
|
|Franz Cauchi (F)93
||
|Marilyn Churley
|-
| style="background:whitesmoke;"|Whitby—AjaxMarch 30, 2006
|
|Judi Longfield14,529
||
|Christine Elliott15,843
|
|Julie Gladman3,204
|
|Nick Boileau307
|
|Paul McKeever (F)198
||
|Jim Flaherty
|-
| style="background:whitesmoke;"|Nepean—CarletonMarch 30, 2006
|
|Brian Ford9,457
||
|Lisa MacLeod17,311
|
|Laurel Gibbons2,489
|
|Peter Tretter634
|
|
||
|John Baird
|-
| style="background:whitesmoke;"|Parkdale—High ParkSeptember 14, 2006
|
|Sylvia Watson9,387
|
|David Hutcheon4,921
||
|Cheri DiNovo11,675
|
|Frank de Jong1,758
|
|Stan Grzywna (FCP)366Jim McIntosh (Lbt)162Silvio Ursomarzo (F)111John Turmel (Ind)77
||
|Gerard Kennedy
|-
| style="background:whitesmoke;"|York South—WestonFebruary 8, 2007
|
|Laura Albanese7,830
|
|Pina Martino1,941
||
|Paul Ferreira8,188
|
|Mir Kamal262
|
|Kevin Clarke (Ind)220Mohammed Choudhary (Ind)142Mariangela Sanabria (FCP)139Nunzio Venuto (Lbt)98Wayne Simmons (F)77
||
|Joseph Cordiano
|-
| style="background:whitesmoke;"|BurlingtonFebruary 8, 2007
|
|Joan Lougheed9,365
||
|Joyce Savoline11,143 	
|
|Cory Judson1,310
|
|Frank de Jong734
|
|Paul Micelli (F)106John Turmel (Ind)90
||
|Cam Jackson
|-
| style="background:whitesmoke;"|MarkhamFebruary 8, 2007
||
|Michael Chan9,080
|
|Alex Yuan6,420
|
|Janice Hagan1,492
|
|Bernadette Manning999
|
|Cathy McKeever (F)159Patrick Redmond (FCP)135Jay Miller (Lbt)126
||
|Tony Wong
|}

See also

Politics of Ontario
List of Ontario political parties
Premier of Ontario
Leader of the Opposition (Ontario)

References

Further reading

External links

General resources
Party platforms
Government of Ontario
Ontario Legislative Assembly 
CBC - Ontario Votes 2003

Parties

Parties with seats in the house prior to dissolution
Ontario Liberal Party

Ontario New Democratic Party
Ontario Progressive Conservative Party

Other parties
Communist Party of Canada (Ontario)
Ontario Family Party
Freedom Party of Ontario
Green Party of Ontario
Ontario Libertarian Party
Ontario Provincial Confederation of Regions Party

Ontario general
2003
General election
October 2003 events in Canada